Nicola Dalmonte (born 13 September 1997) is an Italian footballer who plays as a striker for Vicenza.

Club career
Dalmonte is a youth exponent from Cesena. He made his Serie A debut on 26 April 2015 against Genoa. He replaced Franco Brienza after 59 minutes in a 3–1 away defeat.

On 31 July 2018, Dalmonte signed with Serie A club Genoa. 
On 17 July 2019, Dalmonte signed to FC Lugano on loan until 30 June 2020. On 13 January 2020, he moved on loan to Serie B club Trapani. On 8 September 2020 he was loaned to Vicenza.

On 17 June 2021, he moved to Vicenza on a permanent basis and signed a three-year contract.

References

Living people
1997 births
Sportspeople from Ravenna
Association football forwards
Italian footballers
Italian expatriate footballers
Italy youth international footballers
A.C. Cesena players
Genoa C.F.C. players
FC Lugano players
Trapani Calcio players
L.R. Vicenza players
Serie A players
Serie B players
Swiss Super League players
Italian expatriate sportspeople in Switzerland
Expatriate footballers in Switzerland
Footballers from Emilia-Romagna